Elections to Belfast City Council were held on 5 May 2011 on the same day as the other Northern Irish local government elections. The election used nine district electoral areas to elect a total of 51 councillors, most representing the more heavily populated north and west.

Sinn Féin emerged as the largest party, and Niall Ó Donnghaile became Lord Mayor.

Election results

Note: "Votes" are the first preference votes.

Districts summary

|- class="unsortable" align="centre"
!rowspan=2 align="left"|Ward
! % 
!Cllrs
! %
!Cllrs
! %
!Cllrs
! %
!Cllrs
! %
!Cllrs
! %
!Cllrs
! %
!Cllrs
!rowspan=2|TotalCllrs
|- class="unsortable" align="center"
!colspan=2 bgcolor="" | Sinn Féin
!colspan=2 bgcolor="" | DUP
!colspan=2 bgcolor=""| SDLP
!colspan=2 bgcolor="" | Alliance
!colspan=2 bgcolor="" | UUP
!colspan=2 bgcolor="" | PUP
!colspan=2 bgcolor="white"| Others
|-
|align="left"|Balmoral
|14.7
|1
|19.6
|1
|bgcolor="#99FF66"|29.0
|bgcolor="#99FF66"|2
|17.6
|1
|15.1
|1
|0.0
|0
|3.9
|0
|6
|-
|align="left"|Castle
|26.6
|2
|bgcolor="#D46A4C"|30.5
|bgcolor="#D46A4C"|2
|22.4
|1
|6.9
|0
|11.8
|1
|0.0
|0
|1.7
|0
|6
|-
|align="left"|Court
|2.8
|0
|bgcolor="#D46A4C"|64.4
|bgcolor="#D46A4C"|3
|1.5
|0
|1.2
|0
|6.0
|0
|9.7
|1
|14.4
|1
|5
|-
|align="left"|Laganbank
|17.3
|1
|14.1
|1
|bgcolor="#99FF66"|27.4
|bgcolor="#99FF66"|2
|19.0
|1
|11.5
|0
|0.0
|0
|10.8
|0
|5
|-
|align="left"|Lower Falls
|bgcolor="#008800"|75.4
|bgcolor="#008800"|4
|0.0
|0
|10.2
|1
|0.0
|0
|0.0
|0
|0.0
|0
|14.4
|0
|5
|-
|align="left"|Oldpark
|bgcolor="#008800"|53.1
|bgcolor="#008800"|3
|25.4
|2
|11.2
|1
|2.9
|0
|5.1
|0
|0.0
|0
|5.0
|0
|6
|-
|align="left"|Pottinger
|11.3
|1
|bgcolor="#D46A4C"|36.8
|bgcolor="#D46A4C"|3
|4.8
|0
|19.9
|1
|8.3
|0
|10.7
|1
|8.1
|0
|6
|-
|align="left"|Upper Falls
|bgcolor="#008800"|67.8
|bgcolor="#008800"|4
|1.4
|0
|18.1
|1
|1.3
|0
|0.0
|0
|0.0
|0
|11.3
|0
|5
|-
|align="left"|Victoria
|0.0
|0
|32.6
|3
|1.5
|0
|bgcolor="#F6CB2F"|36.5
|bgcolor="#F6CB2F"|3
|17.9
|1
|6.5
|0
|5.1
|0
|7
|- class="unsortable" class="sortbottom" style="background:#C9C9C9"
|align="left"| Total
|30.9
|16
|23.4
|15
|13.8
|8
|12.6
|6
|8.6
|3
|2.8
|2
|8.0
|1
|51
|-
|}

District results

Balmoral

2005: 2 x SDLP, 2 x DUP, 1 x Alliance, 1 x UUP
2011: 2 x SDLP, 1 x DUP, 1 x Alliance, 1 x UUP, 1 x Sinn Féin
2005-2011 Change: Sinn Féin gain from DUP

Castle

2005: 2 x DUP, 2 x SDLP, 1 x Sinn Féin, 1 x UUP
2011: 2 x DUP, 2 x Sinn Féin, 1 x SDLP, 1 x UUP
2005-2011 Change: Sinn Féin gain from SDLP

Court

2005: 3 x DUP, 1 x PUP, 1 x Independent
2011: 3 x DUP, 1 x PUP, 1 x Independent
2005-2011 Change: No change

Laganbank

2005: 2 x SDLP, 1 x Sinn Féin, 1 x DUP, 1 x UUP
2011: 2 x SDLP, 1 x Sinn Féin, 1 x DUP, 1 x Alliance
2005-2011 Change: Alliance gain from UUP

Lower Falls

2005: 5 x Sinn Féin
2011: 4 x Sinn Féin, 1 x SDLP
2005-2011 Change: SDLP gain from Sinn Féin

Oldpark

2005: 3 x Sinn Féin, 1 x DUP, 1 x SDLP, 1 x UUP
2011: 3 x Sinn Féin, 2 x DUP, 1 x SDLP
2005-2011 Change: DUP gain from UUP

Pottinger

2005: 3 x DUP, 1 x UUP, 1 x PUP, 1 x Alliance
2011: 3 x Sinn Féin, 1 x Alliance, 1 x Sinn Féin, 1 x PUP
2005-2011 Change: Sinn Féin gain from UUP

Upper Falls

2005: 4 x Sinn Féin, 1 x SDLP
2011: 4 x Sinn Féin, 1 x SDLP
2005-2011 Change: No change

Victoria

2005: 3 x DUP, 2 x UUP, 2 x Alliance
2011: 3 x Alliance, 3 x DUP, 1 x UUP
2005-2011 Change: Alliance gain from UUP

References 

2011
2011 Northern Ireland local elections
21st century in Belfast
2011 elections in Northern Ireland